The Rhode Island Historical Preservation and Heritage Commission, often called RIHPHC, is an agency run by the state of Rhode Island that aims to preserve the state's history and heritage. The commission works statewide to protect and upkeep historical buildings, districts, archæological sites and structures. It offers partial funding to those renovating or maintaining historical properties. It also has the role of establishing programs designed to record and celebrate the state's culture and heritage.  RIHPHC has also published a series of publications on the history of each of Rhode Island's thirty nine communities and with a list of important historical places located in each.

The current headquarters of the Rhode Island Historical Preservation and Heritage Commission are in the Old State House, which functioned as the state capitol from 1762 to 1901.

Among its former chairs is historical preservationist Antoinette Downing, who held that post for more than three decades beginning in 1968.

References

Main Website at Preservation RI

External links
Rhode Island Historical Preservation Commission Historic and Architectural Resources Preliminary Reports from the Rhode Island State Archives
Rhode Island Historical Preservation and Heritage Commission slides from the Rhode Island State Archives
Rhode Island: An Inventory of Historic Engineering and Industrial Sites from the Rhode Island State Archives

Rhode Island culture